B&B Theatres is a family-owned and operated American movie theater chain based in Liberty, Missouri.  Founded in 1924, B&B is the fifth-largest theater chain in the United States, operating 500+
screens at 54 locations in Florida, Georgia, Iowa, Kansas, Minnesota, Missouri, Mississippi, North Carolina, Oklahoma, South Carolina, Texas, Virginia, Nebraska, and Washington.    The company also maintains offices in Salisbury, Missouri and Fulton, Missouri.

History
In 1924, Missourian Elmer Bills, Sr., founded Bills Theaters in Salisbury, Missouri.  Elmer met his wife Johnnie when he purchased the Lyric Theater in Salisbury, where she was the piano player for the silent films. Their son Elmer Bills, Jr. was born a few years later.  In 1959, Elmer Jr. graduated from the University of Missouri and married one of his "popcorn girls", Amy. The two generations of Bills continued the expansion of the company, and welcomed the birth of Elmer Jr. and Amy's daughter, Bridget.  Sterling Bagby went to work for Elmer Sr. as a concession clerk at age 10 in 1936.  After serving a stint in World War II, Bagby returned to Missouri and married a ticket seller from Higbee, Pauline.  Together, the Bagbys started the Bagby Traveling Picture Show.  The Show was, in essence, a portable movie theater, and the Bagbys traveled along with the equipment (including seats, snack bar, film, and projectors) showing movies in schools and barns.  Their company became a Kansas circuit of both drive-ins and "hardtop" indoor movie theaters.  Sterling and Pauline have three children: Steve, Bob, and Paula.

The two companies formally merged after years of friendship and combined efforts as B&B (Bills and Bagby) Theaters on January 1, 1980, making the Fulton Cinema the first official B&B Theatre.  Just months earlier in 1979, Bob Bagby married Bridget Bills and cemented the convergence of the two companies.  Sterling died in October 2000, and the remaining family run the National Association of Theatre Owners-recognized Midwest chain.  From 2000 to 2014 B&B replaced several of their existing locations with new facilities as well as acquired, remodeled, or built several new locations.  In 2010 B&B premiered their first PLF (premium large format) Grand Screen® and their first dine-in Marquee Suites® concept auditoriums.

In October 2014, B&B purchased Overland Park, Kansas-based operator Dickinson Theatres.

Digital cinema
In September 2009, B&B Theatres announced that it had selected Christie Digital Systems to supply 2K digital projectors for the circuit's transition to realD 3D-capable digital cinema.  The digital conversion was completed by August 2012.

Locations

Florida
 Amelia Island 7
 Naples Towne Centre 6
 Sebring Fairmount Cinema 6
 Tavernier Cinema 5

Former locations 

 Venice Galleria Stadium 11 (now owned by Spotlight Theatres)

Georgia 
 Athens, Georgia 12

Iowa 

 Ankeny 12 with B-Roll Bowling

Kansas
 Chanute Roxy Cinema 4
 Dodge City Village 8
 Emporia Flinthills 8 Cinemas
 Hutchinson Mall 8
 Iola Sterling Six
 Junction City Gem
 Leavenworth Landing 5
 Overland Park 16
 Shawnee 18
 Topeka Wheatfield 9

Former locations 

 Concordia The Majestic Theatre (now owned by VIP Cinemas)
 McPherson Cinema 4 (now owned by VIP Cinemas)

Minnesota
Bloomington 13 at Mall of America

Mississippi
 Ridgeland Northpark 14
 Vicksburg Mall 6

Missouri
 Bolivar Cinema 5 
Chillicothe Grand 6
 Clinton Missouri Cinema 6
 Festus 8 Cinema 
 Fulton Cinema 8
 Grain Valley Marketplace 8
Hannibal Main Street Cinema 8
Harrisonville Cineplex
 Lebanon Ritz 8
 Lee's Summit 16
 Lee’s Summit New Longview 7
 Liberty Cinema 12
 Mainstreet KC at the Power & Light District
 Moberly Five & Drive
 Monett Plaza 8
 Neosho Cinema 6
 KC Northland 14
 Ozark/Nixa 12
 Sedalia Galaxy 10
 Twin Drive-In
 Waynesville Patriot 12
 Wentzville Tower 12
 Wildwood 10

Former locations 

 Kansas City Extreme Screen Union Station (now run by Union Station)
 Lexington Cannonball 6 (now owned by VIP Cinemas)

Nebraska
 Omaha Oakview Plaza 14

North Carolina
 Park West 14

Oklahoma
 Claremore Cinema 8 
 Miami Cineplex
 Reno Cinema 8 
 Sapulpa Cinema 8 
 Tulsa Starworld 20

Former locations 

 Oklahoma City Windsor 10 (closed)

South Carolina
 Conway 12

Texas
 Port Arthur Central Mall 10
 Wylie 12

Future locations 

 Red Oak 12

Virginia 

 Blacksburg 11 with B-Roll Bowling

Washington 

 Airway Heights 8

See also
 Movie theatre

References

External links
 B&B Theatres company website
 Cinema Treasures
 National Association of Theatre Owners

Movie theatre chains in the United States
Companies based in the Kansas City metropolitan area
Cinemas and movie theaters in Missouri
Liberty, Missouri
Entertainment companies established in 1924
1924 establishments in Missouri
Family-owned companies of the United States